Patrick L. Harrington (born September 17, 1956) is a former member of the Michigan House of Representatives.

Early life
Harrington was born on September 17, 1956.

Career
On November 4, 1980, Harrington was elected to the Michigan House of Representatives where he represented the 39th district from January 14, 1981 to December 31, 1982. During his term, he served as the chamber's Majority Floor Whip for the Democratic Party. In 1982, Harrington was defeated in his run for the Michigan Senate seat representing the 11th district.

Personal life
During his time in the Michigan Legislature, Harrington resided in Monroe, Michigan.

References

Living people
1956 births
Democratic Party members of the Michigan House of Representatives
People from Monroe, Michigan
20th-century American politicians